Jesse Evan Freidin (born 1981) is a fine art dog photographer. He is best known for creating a series of photos of dogs dressed in costumes like those worn by Lady Gaga.

Photography
Freidin creates black-and-white photographs with a 1970s Hasselblad film camera, using only natural light.

For his 'Doggie Gaga Project', in early 2010, Freidin dressed canine models in five of Lady Gaga's most celebrated outfits, and photographed them using two packs of Polaroid film from the last remaining supply.

References

External links
 
 Modern Dog - Lady Gaga Doggie Style
 MSN Celebrity Fix - Lady GaGa - Doggy Style
 The Sunday Times Life & Style - Going Up, Itemid=29 The Doggie Gaga Project - The Interview

Dogs in popular culture
American portrait photographers
Internet humor
Living people
1981 births